Dehmi is a holy village for people from all castes. Shree Mansa mata devi Mandir is one of the holiest Hindu temples dedicated to Shakti, located in the Dehmi village near NH-8 (Delhi to Jaipur) In Hinduism.
Mansa Devi, also known as Mata Rani and Vaishnavi, is a manifestation of the Mother Goddess Durga. Fair is organised  by temple management on the occasion of Navratri.The temple is near the town of Behror and Barrod in the Alwar district in the state of Rajasthan. It is one of the most revered places of worship in Northern India.

Geography
Dehmi is nearby Barrod, Bhatkhani and kakardopa NH-8 (Delhi to Jaipur) Near about Shiva Oasis Resort.

References

Villages in Alwar district
Tourist attractions in Alwar district